Régions et Peuples Solidaires (English: Regions and Peoples with Solidarity) is a political federation of various regionalist parties (particularly of centre-left affiliation) in France. It was founded in 1995, in order to organise a coordinated fight against "Parisian centrism" and "Jacobin conception of peoples" on the French state level. Its president is Gustave Alirol, the chairman of Partit Occitan.

The federation has ties with the European Free Alliance. François Alfonsi of the Partitu di a Nazione Corsa was elected as an MEP in the 2009 European election (South-East) on the Europe Écologie list, and is a member of The Greens–European Free Alliance Group in the European Parliament.

Members of Fédération ("federated parties") are:

Brittany
Breton Democratic Union
Northern Catalonia
Catalan Bloc
Republican Left of Catalonia
Corsica
Party of the Corsican Nation
Let's Do Corsica
Alsace
Our Land
Northern Basque Country
Basque Solidarity
Basque Nationalist Party
Moselle
Mosellans' Party
Savoy
Savoy Region Movement
Occitania
Occitan Party
Tamazgha and Amazigh diaspora
Amazigh World Congress

Former members:

Franche-Comté
Franche-Comté's People Rally (ceased existence in 1999)
Brittany
Breton Liberty (merged with the UDB in 2008)

External links
 Official website

Left-wing parties in France
Regionalist parties in France
Political parties established in 1995
Political party alliances in France